William George Davis (born February 3, 1984) is an American serial killer and former nurse. He was convicted of capital murder for killing four patients with air injections after they received heart surgery at Christus Trinity Mother Frances Hospital in Tyler, Texas. Prosecutors claimed that Davis had at least 11 victims in total, of whom six died. Charges were only brought against Davis for four deaths due to the difficulty in proving the others.

Murders, arrest, and trial 
From 2017 to 2018, multiple patients experienced unexplained complications after heart surgeries while in recovery. Davis was discovered after doctors observed air in the brains of patients on CT scans. Security footage was also captured of Davis in the patients' rooms just before complications started. Davis was fired from his job as a nurse at the hospital a month before he was arrested in April 2018. Davis pled not guilty to the charges. His defense attorney claimed that Davis was a scapegoat because he was there at the time of the deaths. On October 19, 2021, Davis was convicted of capital murder by a Smith County jury. Prosecutors pushed for the death penalty and played a recording of a call from Davis in jail to his ex-wife in which he claimed that he wanted to lengthen the patients' time in the intensive care unit so that he could earn more overtime. The prosecution rejected the claim that the deaths were accidental. On October 27, 2021, Davis was sentenced to death after about two hours of jury deliberation. The sentence was automatically appealed.

Victims 
Davis was convicted of killing John Lafferty, Ronald Clark, Christopher Greenaway, and Joseph Kalina. The first three were killed in 2017, whereas Kalina was attacked in 2018 and died two years later. In his sentencing, he was also accused of killing Perry Frank, James Blanks, and James Sanderson, as well as injuring five other patients.

See also
 Capital punishment in Texas
 List of death row inmates in Texas
 List of serial killers in the United States

References 

1984 births
21st-century American criminals
American male criminals
American nurses
American people convicted of murder
American prisoners sentenced to death
American serial killers
Criminals from Texas
Living people
Male serial killers
Medical serial killers
Nurses convicted of killing patients
People convicted of murder by Texas
People from Longview, Texas
Prisoners sentenced to death by Texas